The 1877 Invercargill mayoral election was held on 21 July 1877.

Joseph Hatch was elected mayor.

Results
The following table gives the election results:

References

1877 elections in New Zealand
Mayoral elections in Invercargill